Ban Yaeng is a subdistrict in the Nakhon Thai District of Phitsanulok Province, Thailand.

Geography
Ban Yaeng lies in the Nan Basin, which is part of the Chao Phraya Watershed.

Administration
The following is a list of the subdistrict's mubans (villages):

Temples
Wat Ban Yaeng is home to the following Buddhist temples:
วัดบ้านแยง in muban 2
วัดหนองหิน in muban 4
วัดสำเนียงราษฎร์ศรัทธาธรรม in muban 5
วัดเกษตรสุขวนาราม in muban 12
วัดใหม่ราษฎร์ศรัทธาธรรม in muban 3
วัดห้วยกอก in muban 1
วัดห้วยเฮี้ย in muban 3
วัดบ้านเข็กใหญ่ in muban 4
วัดเข็กใหม่พัฒนาราม in muban 4
วัดป่าคาย in muban 2
วัดขำรู้ in muban 4

References

Tambon of Phitsanulok province
Populated places in Phitsanulok province